The Damai Centre is a multi-purpose indoor arena located in Dalian, China. It was completed in 2012 for the 2013 National Games of the People's Republic of China. It hosted the basketball and gymnastics events. The capacity of the arena is 18,000 spectators. It was formerly known as Dalian Arena.

It is used for various events, like basketball, boxing, concerts, gymnastics, mixed martial arts and table tennis.

Justin Bieber became the first artist to perform at the arena during his Believe Tour on 2 October 2013.

See also
List of indoor arenas in China

References

Indoor arenas in China
Sport in Dalian